D'Aundre Reed (born January 1, 1988) is a former American football defensive end. He was drafted by the Minnesota Vikings with the 215th overall pick in the seventh round of the 2011 NFL Draft. He has also been a member of the San Francisco 49ers, Jacksonville Jaguars, and Los Angeles Kiss.

Professional career

Minnesota Vikings
Reed was released by the Minnesota Vikings on August 31, 2013 (along with 18 others) to get to their final 53-man roster.

San Francisco 49ers
Reed was signed to the San Francisco 49ers practice squad on September 24, 2013.

Jacksonville Jaguars
Reed was signed to the Jacksonville Jaguars' practice squad on December 17, 2013. He was signed to the active roster at the conclusion of the 2013 regular season.

Los Angeles KISS
Reed was assigned to the Los Angeles KISS of the Arena Football League on May 22, 2014.

Miami Dolphins
On July 29, 2014, Reed was signed by the Miami Dolphins.

References

External links
D'Aundre Reed Arizona Wildcats bio
Jacksonville Jaguars bio

1988 births
Living people
American football defensive ends
Arizona Wildcats football players
Minnesota Vikings players
San Francisco 49ers players
Jacksonville Jaguars players
Los Angeles Kiss players
Miami Dolphins players
Players of American football from Sacramento, California